Electoral district of Brunswick East was an electoral district of the Legislative Assembly in the Australian state of Victoria.

Members for Brunswick East

Election results

References
Re-Member database Parliament of Victoria

Former electoral districts of Victoria (Australia)
1955 establishments in Australia
1976 disestablishments in Australia